Th or TH may refer to:

Language
 Eth (ð), a letter used in Old English, Icelandic, Faroese and Elfdalian
 Th (digraph), a digraph in the Roman alphabet
 Pronunciation of English th aspects of this digraph in English
 Voiced dental fricative , a type of consonantal sound in some languages
 Voiceless dental fricative , a type of consonantal sound in some languages
 Thai language (ISO 639 code), the national and official language of Thailand
 Thorn (letter) (þ), a letter in Old Norse, Old English, Icelandic and related languages
 - th, the most common ordinal number suffix in English (in some style guides rendered th)

Places
 Thuringia, a state of Germany
 Territory of Hawaii, formerly the Republic of Hawaii and prior to that the Kingdom of Hawaii

Science and technology

Biology and medicine
 T helper cell Th, in the immune system
 Terminologia Histologica, an international standard for nomenclature in cytology and histology
 Thyroid hormones, in the endocrine system
 Tyrosine hydroxylase, an enzyme

Units of measurement
 Thomson (unit) (Th) in mass spectrometry
 Thermie (th), metric unit of heat energy equal to 1,000 kilocalories

Other uses in science and technology
 .th, the Internet country code top-level domain for Thailand
 Thorium, symbol Th, a chemical element
 Tianhe (space station module)
 , HTML element for table header cell
 Hold time (th) of a flip flop in electronics

Groups, organizations, companies
 Tommy Hilfiger, an apparel brand
 Taiwan Historica, an academic institution in Nantou County, Taiwan
 Technische Hochschule, a Technical University in German-speaking countries
 Technische Hogeschool, a Technical University in Dutch-speaking countries
 Telegraph Herald, a newspaper in Dubuque, Iowa, USA, nickname
 Thai Airways Company (former IATA airline designator TH)
 Raya Airways, Malaysia (IATA airline designator TH)

Other uses
 Thursday, abbreviated Th
 Th (album), a 1997 album by the Glenn Spearman–John Heward Group

See also